Robert Gladstone Kinsey (May 9, 1897 – September 18, 1964) was an American male tennis player.

In 1924, he won the U.S. National Championship men's doubles championship with his brother Howard Kinsey by defeating the Australian team of Gerald Patterson and Pat O'Hara in four sets.

Kinsey represented Mexico in the Davis Cup, competing in three ties between 1927 and 1929.

Grand Slam finals

Doubles: (1 title)

References

External links
 
 
 Find-A-Grave Memorial

1897 births
1964 deaths
United States National champions (tennis)
Professional tennis players before the Open Era
American male tennis players
Mexican male tennis players
Grand Slam (tennis) champions in men's doubles